Lucinda Elizabeth Gooderham (born 9 June 1984) is a former British rower.

Rowing career
Gooderham represented England at U23 level before teaching full-time. She made her senior British debut in 2013.

After finishing in ninth place at both the 2013 and 2014 World Championships Gooderham was part of the British team that topped the medal table at the 2015 World Rowing Championships at Lac d'Aiguebelette in France, where she won a silver medal as part of the coxless four with Rebecca Chin, Karen Bennett and Holly Norton.

References

British female rowers
World Rowing Championships medalists for Great Britain
Living people
1984 births
Durham University Boat Club rowers
Alumni of the College of St Hild and St Bede, Durham
People from Garboldisham